Free store may refer to:

 Give-away shop, a shop where all items are available at no cost
 In computer programming, a region of memory used for dynamic memory management